Dragon Ball Z: Ultimate Tenkaichi is a game based on the manga and anime franchise Dragon Ball Z. It was developed by Spike and published by Namco Bandai Games under the Bandai label in late October 2011 for the PlayStation 3 and Xbox 360. Despite its English title, it is not actually a part of the Budokai Tenkaichi fighting game series.

The game is a 3D fighter that allows players to take control of various characters from the Dragon Ball Z franchise or created by the player to either fight against the AI, or with another player locally or online.

Development 
The game was first announced under the working title Dragon Ball Game Project Age 2011 in the early May issue of Weekly Shonen Jump magazine. The announcement featured several screenshots with Goku and Vegeta, in both normal and Super Saiyan forms, highlighting the game's mechanics. The announcement stated that the game would feature superb visuals and would be released in Japan sometime in autumn of 2011 for both PlayStation 3 and Xbox 360 gaming consoles. A few days later the North American branch of Namco Bandai released a press statement announcing that they would be releasing the game throughout North America. They also confirmed that Spike would return to work on the game. The June issue of V Jump magazine showcased several screenshots of Goku and Vegeta, in his Oozaru form, demonstrating a type of timed button action mechanic. It also confirmed the return of the destructible environments mechanics from previous Budokai Tenkaichi and Raging Blast games.

In the following Namco Bandai press release, it was announced that the game's official English title would be Ultimate Tenkaichi and that its release date would be October 25, while its European release date was revealed to be October 28. The title was chosen by fans through a survey conducted by Namco Bandai along with four other possible choices. In response, Namco Bandai marketing president Carlson Choi stated their reasoning for the outreach by describing the fans as "the most passionate gamers and anime experts in the world." Later in July, it was announced that the game would not only include the return of GT characters to the roster, but also include a type of character creation and customization mode. The August 8 issue of Shonen Jump featured screenshots of the story mode, showcasing a type of free-roam mechanic similar to that found in Budokai 3 and the later Budokai Tenkaichi games, where the player could explore the entire planet from the sky and land in certain areas. The following issue of V Jump revealed that the game will be released under the title of Ultimate Blast in Japan, with the release date for December 8.
In early September, more details were divulged on the character creator mode referred to as "Hero Mode". The mode gives players the option of customizing a character of their choosing with a variety of existing and original outfits and hairstyles, in addition to the ability to change and adjust their color schemes.
The following issue of Shonen Jump revealed that the game would include a new opening introduction in traditional 2D animation set to the song "Cha-La Head-Cha-La" by Hironobu Kageyama (Dragon Ball Z's 1st Opening Song in Japan).

Promotions 
While in Europe, preorders came with a free capsule pen with their purchase. The European version also had a special collectors edition that came boxed with a Son Gohan figure in Super Saiyan form dressed in his Great Saiyaman costume.

Characters

Reception 

Dragon Ball Z: Ultimate Tenkaichi received mixed reviews. IGN gave the game a 7.5 out of 10, praising the graphics and combat, but criticized the storytelling and the repetitive nature of the battles. GameSpot gave the game a 4.0 out of 10, praising the graphics, but detested the game's combat system as there is no sense of originality; the boss fights due to the frustrating Quick Time Event stages; and the character creation system due to the limited amount of items given. Destructoid gave the game a 7.5 saying "While combat can be a bit on the repetitive side, there's still that hint of satisfaction when you decimate your foe with a canyon-creating power move. There's a lot here for fans to enjoy, and while the story may be streamlined for new fans of the franchise, I can't really recommend it to anyone but the hardcore."

Notes

References

External links 
	

 
 

2011 video games
Spike (company) games
Bandai Namco games
Video games developed in Japan
PlayStation 3 games
Xbox 360 games
Ultimate Tenkaichi
Fighting games
Video games with cel-shaded animation
Multiplayer and single-player video games
Toei Animation video game projects